Staying with the Trouble: Making Kin in the Chthulucene is a 2016 book by Donna Haraway, published by Duke University Press. In a thesis statement, Haraway writes: "Staying with the trouble means making oddkin; that is, we require each other in unexpected collaborations and combinations, in hot compost piles. We become - with each other or not at all." Both the imagery of the compost pile and the concept of oddkin are repeated motifs throughout the work. 

By emphasizing connectedness, Staying with the Trouble can be thought of as a continuation of major themes from "A Cyborg Manifesto" and The Companion Species Manifesto. Haraway's book can also be thought of as a critique of the Anthropocene as a way of making sense of the present, de-emphasizing human exceptionalism in favor of multispecism.

Structure 
Staying with the Trouble is broken into eight chapters, the majority of which are revisions of previous work dating from as early as 2012. 

One: Playing String Figures with Companion Species

Written in honor of G. Evelyn Hutchinson, Haraway's PhD Advisor, and Beatriz da Costa.

Two: Tentacular Thinking: Anthropocene, Captialocene, Chthulucene

Three: Sympoiesis: Symbiogenesis and the Lively Arts of Staying with the Trouble

Four: Making Kin: Anthropocene, Captialocene, Plantationcene, Chthulucene

Five: Awash in Urine: DES and Premarin in Multispecies Response-ability

Six: Sowing Worlds: A Seed Bag for Terraforming with Earth Others

Seven: A Curious Practice

Eight: The Camille Stories: Children of Compost

References 

Works by Donna Haraway
Science and technology studies works